Kate Dollenmayer is an American actor. She debuted as lead actor in the 2002 film Funny Ha Ha by Andrew Bujalski.

She obtained her BA in Earth and Planetary Studies from Harvard University in 1998 and then an MFA in Film/Video from California Institute of the Arts in 2003. She has been a faculty member at the School of Fine Arts at UCSD. She a currently a Senior Film Archivist at the Academy of Motion Picture Arts and Sciences.

References

External links
 
The Dream Is Still a Dream featured on the 2005 Showcase of the CalArts' F/V Program (QuickTime Required)

American film actresses
Place of birth missing (living people)
Living people
21st-century American actresses
Year of birth missing (living people)
California Institute of the Arts alumni
Harvard College alumni
University of California, San Diego faculty